South Carolina Highway 912 (SC 912) is a  state highway in the U.S. state of South Carolina. The highway travels through rural areas of Marlboro County. It functions like a western bypass of the city of Bennettsville.

Route description

SC 912 begins at an intersection with U.S. Route 15 (US 15) and US 401 southwest of Bennettsville, Marlboro County, where the roadway continues as Marlboro Road. It travels to the west-northwest and begins curving to the northwest before crossing over Crooked Creek. It then curves to the north-northeast. SC 912 crosses over some railroad tracks before curving to the north-northwest. It crosses over Pledger Creek; this bridge is southwest of Becker Pond. Then, it curves to the north-northeast and the north. The highway curves to the north-northwest and travels just west of McLaurins Millpond. Just before Ridgeway Road, it curves to the north-northeast and meets its northern terminus, an intersection with SC 9 at a point northwest of Bennettsville.

Major intersections

See also

References

External links

SC 912 at Virginia Highways' South Carolina Highways Annex

912
Transportation in Marlboro County, South Carolina